Charles Spencer may refer to:

Nobility
 Charles Spencer, 3rd Earl of Sunderland (1675–1722), English statesman
 Charles Spencer, 3rd Duke of Marlborough (1706–1758), British soldier and politician
 Lord Charles Spencer (1740–1820), 2nd son of the 3rd Duke of Marlborough
 Charles Spencer, 6th Earl Spencer (1857–1922), British courtier and Liberal politician
 Charles Spencer, 9th Earl Spencer (born 1964), brother of Diana, Princess of Wales

Sports
 Charles Spencer (cricketer) (1903–1941), Welsh cricketer
 Charlie Spencer (1899–1953), England and Newcastle United footballer
 Charles Spencer (American football) (born 1982), American football player
 Tony Mamaluke (born 1977), American professional wrestler a.k.a. Charles John Spencer

Other
 Charles A. Spencer (1813–1881), American scientific pioneer and inventor
 Charles Nichols Spencer (1837–1893), Hawaiian businessman and politician
 Charles Cozens Spencer (1874–1930), British-born film exhibitor and producer in Australia
 Charles S. Spencer (born 1950), Chair, Division of Anthropology, American Museum of Natural History, New York City
 Charles Spencer (journalist) (born 1955), British journalist and longstanding drama critic of the Daily Telegraph
 Charles Spencer (pianist) (born 1955), English classical pianist and music educator

See also
 Charles H. Spencer, a 1912 steamboat that ran on the Colorado River
Charles R. Spencer, a 1901 steamboat that ran on the Columbia and Willamette Rivers
Charles Spencer-Churchill (disambiguation)